Manual Gonsalus was the first non-Indian settler in Mamakating, New York. His grave is located on the property of the Wurtsboro-Sullivan County Airport. His tombstone is dated April 18, 1752, and is one of the oldest tombstones in New York state, and is part of the Historical Society of Mamakating, NY. His grave is part of several on the airport, in a small cemetery just off the old homestead's property.

1752 deaths
People from Sullivan County, New York
Date of birth unknown
American pioneers